Placusa is a genus of beetles belonging to the family Staphylinidae.

The genus has almost cosmopolitan distribution.

Species:
 Placusa acrotonoides Cameron, 1925 
 Placusa acuminata Kraatz, 1859

References

Staphylinidae
Staphylinidae genera